Tin-Essako  Cercle is an administrative subdivision of the Kidal Region of Mali. The administrative center (chef-lieu) is at the village of Tin-Essako. In the 2009 census the cercle had a population of 7,976 people. The cercle is the least populated in Mali and has an extreme Saharian climate.

Communes
Tin-Essako Cercle contains the following two rural communes:

 Intadjedite
 Tin-Essako

References

Cercles of Mali
Kidal Region